The Oromia Broadcasting Network (OBN) is an Ethiopian public service broadcaster headquartered in Addis Ababa, Ethiopia. It is the leading media organization in the Oromia and broadcast on Eutelsat via the Ethiosat platform.

History 
The channel is run by the Oromia Radio and Television Organization (ORTO), founded on 12 July 2006 by Proclamation number 113/2006 of the Regional Government, as Oromia mass media organization (OMMO). The organization was renamed by the regional government to Oromia Radio and TV Organization by the Proclamation No. 164/2011 in 2011. Oromia Broadcasting Network established according to Oromia Mass Media Organization establishment Proclamation No. 133 of 2006, to widely disseminate the timely gathered international and local information to the public and government bodies. It has been broadcasting independent news, educational and entertainment programs, in 14 Ethiopian Languages and 3 international languages on Radio and TV Medias.

Media Coverage

The Organization has been broadcasting for 119 hours per week on Radio and 24 hours a day on TV and covering 100% of the region by FM and AM Radio waves and more than 70% by TV using antenna (micro wave). Also we are reaching the abroad listeners and audiences by Nile sat7, Amos Ku band 5,170 east, Galaxy 19,970 west, Optus D2, 152o east, NSS 12,570 east, Thaicom 5,78o east satellites and websites (www.orto.gov.et).

Notably Prime Minister Abiy Ahmed was a board member of the organization that runs OBN before assuming the office of Prime Minister.

In February 2018 the president of the Oromia regional state, Lemma Megersa, pledged to defend the independence and impartiality of the state-run Oromia Broadcasting Network (OBN), among others. He stated this after a central committee meeting in Adama by the OPDO, the Oromo faction of the ruling EPRDF party that controls the Oromia.

Programming 
Content is mostly focused on news from the Oromia regional state, but also covers news from the national and international levels. The majority of broadcasts are in Oromo, one of the six official languages of Ethiopia. with some programs in Amharic, Afar, Somali, Kiswahili Arabic and English.

Political significance 
Many prominent Oromo leaders in the government of Ethiopia use OBN as a platform to reach the majority of the Oromo speaking population such as when leading OPDO figure Abadula Gemeda announced his displeasure with the government's mistreatment of internally displaced Oromo people in 2017.

In March 2018, OBN was the first to confirm a deadly incident in the border town of Moyale via an interview with the town's mayor.

Controversy

The Oromia Media Networks along with two broadcasters, Tigray TV and Dimtse Woyane were alleged to disseminate media propaganda by Ethiopian government following the death of Hachalu Hundessa on 29 June 2020. These three networks alleged to be operated by two political parties, Oromo Liberation Front and Tigray People's Liberation Front. The two parties were labeled as "terrorist agent" by the government and responsible for inciting violence after Hachalu Hundessa death. The Federal Attorney-General launched an investigation on three broadcasters in connection with alleged roles in inciting ethnic violence in Ethiopia. The channels has been breaching the broadcasting laws and warned to lift off-air in Ethiopia and ordered to shut down proclamation as of 6 July. However the channels guarantee for broadcast via international networks, primarily using North American networks.

References

External links

Television channels in Ethiopia
Publicly funded broadcasters
Oromia Region
Oromo language
2012 establishments in Ethiopia
Television networks
Television channels and stations established in 2012
Satellite television